Ghulam Safdar Butt (13 March 1928 – 1 May 2006) was the first three-star rank General in the Corps of engineers of the Pakistan Army. He also held the honour of being the first PhD of the Pakistan army.

Military career
He was commissioned in the Pakistan Army in 1950 after graduating from the Pakistan Military Academy (PMA). He was part of the first PMA Long Course which was the first course to graduate from the PMA that was selected, trained and graduated in Pakistan after its partition from India in 14 August 1947. He had an illustrious career starting from Professorship at the Military College of Engineering, Professor of Highways, Airfields, Soil and Foundation engineering, integral work on the Karakorum Highway KKH, Platoon Commander at PMA, Director General Frontier Works Organization, Director General Lowari Tunnel Organization (LTO), Managing Director Pak Arab Refinery Co (PARCO), Chairman Water & Power Development Authority (WAPDA), Chairman Pakistan Cricket Board (PCB), Chairman National Highway Authority (NHA) and finally Chairman Sui Northern Gas Pipelines Ltd (SNGPL)] were some of the prestigious posts held by him in his career.

Post retirement work
He was President of the Pakistan Cricket Board, serving in the position from February 1984 to February 1988. He was a founding member, Secretary General and President of the Alpine Club of Pakistan.

Death
A passionate mountaineer, he died on May 1, 2006, after an aggressive bout with a brain tumor at the age of 78, and was buried the same day.

References

1928 births
2006 deaths
Pakistan Army officers
Pakistan Cricket Board Presidents and Chairmen
Pakistani generals
Pakistani military engineers
Pakistani people of Kashmiri descent